Lieutenant Colonel Guy Newcombe Bignell  (3 December 1886 – 10 June 1965) was an English cricketer and Indian Army officer. Bignell was a right-handed batsman who bowled right-arm medium pace.

He was the fifth son of Mr R. Bignall.

Bignell was educated at Haileybury and Imperial Service College, where he played for the college cricket team.

Bignell made his first-class debut for Hampshire against Warwickshire in the 1904 County Championship.

The following season Bignell scored his maiden first-class century against Kent at the United Services Recreation Ground, Portsmouth. Bignell also represented the Gentlemen of the South in a single first-class match against the Players of the South, the Gentlemen side featured W.G. Grace.

Bignell played six matches for Hampshire in 1905, but would not represent the county again until the 1908 season, where he played in eleven first-class matches for the county. During that season Bignell also represented Hambledon in a ceremonial match against an England XI.

He attended the Royal Military College, Sandhurst in 1905 and was commissioned on to the Unattached List for the Indian Army as a Second Lieutenant 24 January 1906.

He was then attached to a British Army regiment in India for a year, then on 17 March 1907 he was appointed to the Indian Army and the 29th Punjabis.

Promoted Lieutenant 24 April 1908.

Bignell next appeared for Hampshire in the 1912 season, where he played 22 first-class matches for Hampshire, scoring 428 runs in process at a batting average of 17.12. Bignell made two half centuries and a high score of 79.

During World War I he served with his regiment in East Africa from 1 September 1914 to 31 October 1916. For his service he was mentioned in despatches and awarded the Military Cross, as well as being promoted Captain 24 January 1915. Later he served in Palestine from 5 April to 31 October 1918.

Bignell's next appearance came after the First World War in 1919, playing his first return match against Surrey. During the 1919 season, Bignell played twelve first-class matches scoring 358 runs at a batting average of 21.05 and two further fifties.

Back in Palestine, he was appointed Brigade Major of the 30th Infantry Brigade 25 June 1920 to 29 April 1921 and 29th Infantry Brigade 6 May 1921 to 4 September 1922. He was promoted Major 24 January 1921.

He served with the 29th Punjabis until 30 April 1922. By April 1923 he serving with the 3rd battalion, 2nd Punjab Regiment.

Bignell next appeared in first-class cricket in 1924, this time in India for the Europeans (India) against the Hindus. This was Bignell's only appearance for the Europeans.

In 1925 Bignell returned to Hampshire, playing four first-class matches. Bignell's final first-class match came against Warwickshire, the same team 21 years earlier Bignell had made his debut against. In Bignell's 55 first-class matches for Hampshire he scored 1,582 runs at a batting average of 20.54, with one century and eight half centuries and a high score of 109. With the ball Bignell took 17 wickets at a bowling average of 42.47, with best figures of 3–67. In the field Bignell took 22 catches for the county.

On 11 October 1930 he was appointed second in command of the 10th battalion, 15th Punjab Regiment and on 25 December 1931 was promoted Lieutenant-Colonel and commandant of the 10th battalion, 15th Punjab Regiment. He held this post until he retired on 25 December 1935.

During World War II he was first involved with Civil Defence from 1940 to 1942 and then was employed with the Ministry of Fuel & Power in 1942.

Bignell died at Lausanne, Switzerland on 10 June 1965.

Family
Bignell's brother, Hugh Bignell also played first-class cricket for Hampshire and the Europeans.

References

External links

1886 births
1965 deaths
People educated at Haileybury and Imperial Service College
English cricketers
Hampshire cricketers
Europeans cricketers
British Indian Army officers
Gentlemen of the South cricketers
Graduates of the Royal Military College, Sandhurst
Indian Army personnel of World War I
Punjab Regiment officers
British people in colonial India